Canto is the second studio album by Latin supergroup Los Super Seven. It was released in March 2001, under Legacy Recordings.

Track listing

Charts

References

2001 albums
Los Super Seven albums
Folk albums by American artists